Ghana competed at the 2015 African Games held in Brazzaville, Republic of the Congo.

Medal summary

Medal table

Football 

Ghana won the women's tournament.

Judo 

Emmanuel Nartey won one of the bronze medals in the men's 73 kg event.

Swimming 

Several swimmers represented Ghana at the 2015 African Games.

References 

Nations at the 2015 African Games
2015
African Games